Ligurra is a spider genus of the jumping spider family, Salticidae.

Species
 Ligurra aheneola (Simon, 1885) – Malaysia
 Ligurra latidens (Doleschall, 1859) – Malaysia to Indonesia
 Ligurra moniensis Prószyński & Deeleman-Reinhold, 2010 – Indonesia (Flores)

References
  (2021): The world spider catalog, version 22.5. American Museum of Natural History.

Salticidae
Spiders of Asia
Salticidae genera